Menecles is a genus of stink bugs in the family Pentatomidae. There are at least two described species in Menecles.

Species
These two species belong to the genus Menecles:
 Menecles insertus (Say, 1832)
 Menecles portacrus Rolston, 1973

References

Further reading

External links

 

Pentatomidae genera
Articles created by Qbugbot
Pentatomini